

Owners

Milwaukee Brewers (1901)
Henry Killilea

St. Louis Browns (1902—1953)
Robert Hedges
Phil Ball
Phil Ball estate
Donald Lee Barnes
Richard Muckerman
Bill DeWitt
Bill Veeck

Baltimore Orioles (1954—present)
Jerold Hoffberger & Clarence Miles
Jerold Hoffberger & James Keelty
Jerold Hoffberger & Joe Iglehart
Jerold Hoffberger
Edward Bennett Williams
Eli Jacobs
Peter Angelos

General Managers
Bill DeWitt
Bill Veeck
Arthur Ehlers
Paul Richards
Lee MacPhail
Harry Dalton
Frank Cashen
Hank Peters
Roland Hemond
Pat Gillick
Frank Wren
Syd Thrift
Jim Beattie
Jim Duquette
Mike Flanagan
Andy MacPhail
Dan Duquette
Mike Elias

Other executives
Brady Anderson
John Angelos
Don Buford
Jim Duquette
Tommy Giordano
Gordon Goldsberry
Lou Gorman
Wayne Krivsky
Larry Lucchino
Kevin Malone
Doug Melvin
Dan O'Dowd
Eddie Robinson
Frank Robinson
Bob Schaefer
Lee Thomas
Tom Trebelhorn
William Walsingham, Jr.

External links
Baseball America: Executive Database

 
 
Baltimore
Owners and executives